Ingeborg Pehrson (16 December 1886 – 11 April 1950) was a Danish stage and film actress.

Selected filmography

Elverhøj - 1917
Den sidste af Slægten - 1922
En Nat i København - 1924
Lille Dorrit - 1924
Københavnere - 1933
Flight from the Millions - 1934
Week-End - 1935
Min kone er husar - 1935
De bør forelske Dem - 1935
Flådens blå matroser - 1937
Der var engang en vicevært - 1937
Plat eller krone - 1937
Bolettes brudefærd - 1938
Under byens tage - 1938
Nordhavets mænd - 1939
Pas på svinget i Solby - 1940
Familien Olsen - 19
Sommerglæder - 1940
En pige med pep - 1940
Niels Pind og hans dreng - 1941
En søndag på Amager - 1941
Søren Søndervold - 1942
Ta' briller på - 1942
Tordenskjold går i land - 1942
Frøken Vildkat - 1942
Et skud før midnat - 1942
Ebberød Bank - 1943
Hans onsdagsveninde - 1943
Kriminalassistent Bloch - 1943
Mordets melodi - 1944
Teatertosset - 1944
Familien Gelinde - 1944
Det bødes der for - 1944
Biskoppen - 1944
Man elsker kun een gang - 1945
Jeg elsker en anden - 1946
Billet mrk. - 1946
Op med lille Martha - 1946
Sikken en nat - 1947
Tre år efter - 1948
Min kone er uskyldig - 1950

External links

Danish stage actresses
Danish film actresses
Danish silent film actresses
20th-century Danish actresses
1886 births
1950 deaths
Burials at Hellerup Cemetery